Hajibaba Baghirov (June 12, 1932 – October 4, 2006) was an Azerbaijani actor. He was famous mostly for his comedy roles.

References

External links
 

1932 births
2006 deaths
Azerbaijani male film actors
Azerbaijani male stage actors
Artists from Baku
People's Artists of Azerbaijan
Soviet Azerbaijani people
Burials at II Alley of Honor